Sport Club Cañadense is an Argentine sports club from Cañada de Gómez, Santa Fe Province. Although many sports are practised at the club, the institution is mostly known for both its football and basketball teams.

The club's football team plays in the Liga Cañadense de Fútbol, a local tournament which Sport Club won 18 times, becoming the top title-winner in league history. The basketball squad plays at the Torneo Nacional de Ascenso (TNA), the second division of the Liga Nacional de Básquetbol, which Sport Club participated 11 seasons. The team's most important achievement was in 1990, when reached the final games against Atenas de Córdoba but Sport Club finally was defeated 0–3.

Other sports hosted by Cañadense are field hockey, gymnastics, roller skating, swimming and tennis.

References

External links
Official website 
El Blog de los Celestes
Live broadcast and news

 
C
C
C
C
C
C
Basketball teams established in 1913